Aji Buzayeh (also Romanized as Ājī Būzāyeh; also known as Ājī Būrāyeh and Ḩājjī Bozāyeh) is a village in Gafsheh-ye Lasht-e Nesha Rural District, Lasht-e Nesha District, Rasht County, Gilan Province, Iran. At the 2006 census, its population was 746, in 215 families.

References 

Populated places in Rasht County